Romain Ciaravino (born 24 January 1984) is a French professional footballer.

His father Michel played in Ligue 1 for FC Girondins de Bordeaux and AS Nancy.

External links
 Profile at Soccerway
 Profile at L'Équipe

1984 births
Living people
Association football midfielders
French footballers
Ligue 2 players
FC Istres players
Stade Lavallois players
Amiens SC players